Demesmaekerite is a rare uranium selenite mineral with the chemical formula: Pb2Cu5(UO2)2(SeO3)6(OH)6·2H2O.

It is named after the Belgian mineralogist Gaston Demesmaeker, who worked at the Musonoi Mine in Katanga. It is a secondary mineral which contains lead, copper and selenium, it is a bottle green to brown/yellow color, its crystal habit varies depending on where it is found. It has pleochroic attributes, which means depending on which axis it is seen, the gem displays different colors, which is an optical phenomenon. On the X axis it displays a yellow-green color, and on the Y the gem is seen in a brown color. Demesmaekerite has a very strong radioactivity, 1,629,108.74, measured in GRapi (Gamma Ray American Petroleum Institute Units). It is mostly made out of oxygen (22.1%), uranium (21.92%) which causes its irradiative attributes, selenium (21.81%), lead (19.08%) which is a poisonous chemical element and copper (14.63%), but also contains hydrogen (0.46%).

It can be found associated with other rare selenium-bearing uranium ores, such as haynesite, guilleminite, marthozite and piretite.

References

Uranium(VI) minerals
Selenium minerals
Lead minerals
Copper minerals
Triclinic minerals
Minerals in space group 2